The Gau Pomerania (German: Gau Pommern) formed on 22 March 1925, was an administrative division of Nazi Germany from 1933 to 1945 comprising the Prussian province of Pomerania. Before that, from 1925 to 1933, it was the regional subdivision of the Nazi Party in that area. Most of the Gau became part of Poland after the Second World War while the remainder became part of what would become East Germany.

History
The Nazi Gau (plural Gaue) system was originally established in a party conference on 22 May 1926, in order to improve administration of the party structure. From 1933 onwards, after the Nazi seizure of power, the Gaue increasingly replaced the German states as administrative subdivisions in Germany.

At the head of each Gau stood a Gauleiter, a position which became increasingly more powerful, especially after the outbreak of the Second World War, with little interference from above. Local Gauleiters often held government positions as well as party ones and were in charge of, among other things, propaganda and surveillance and, from September 1944 onward, the Volkssturm and the defense of the Gau.

The position of Gauleiter in Pomerania was first held by Theodor Vahlen from 1925 to 1927 when he was dismissed because of his association with Gregor and Otto Strasser. He was succeeded as Gauleiter by Walther von Corswant from 1927 to 1931, who continued to represent Pomerania as a Reichstag member until his death in 1942. The post of Gauleiter was next held by  Wilhelm Karpenstein from 1931 to 1934, followed by Franz Schwede-Coburg from 1934 to 1945. Karpenstein survived the war and died in 1968. Franz Schwede was the first Nazi Party member to become Mayor of a German city, Coburg in Bavaria, and was therefore awarded the honorary addition of Coburg to his name by Adolf Hitler. Highly anti-Semitic Schwede-Coburg had the last Jews in Pomerania deported in early 1940 and thereby made the Gau the first to be Judenrein, free of Jews. When Soviet forces reached Pomerania he delayed the order of evacuation, thereby abandoning much of the population and goods behind enemy lines. His insistence in sending under-trained Volkssturm units into battle caused Pomerania to have the third-highest Volkssturm casualty of all German Gaue. He escaped from Pomerania but was captured by British forces. Sent to prison for 10 years in 1948, he died in Coburg in 1960.

See also
 Gauliga Pommern, the highest association football league in the Gauliga from 1933 to 1945

References

External links
 Illustrated list of Gauleiter

Pomerania
1931 establishments in Germany
1945 disestablishments in Germany
History of Pomerania